{{Infobox person
| name         = Albert Dieudonné
| image        = Choumoff - Albert Dieudonné Napoleon.jpg
| alt          = A monochrome photographic portrait of a handsome man in his late 20s wearing a French general's uniform from the 1790s and a cocked hat over stringy dark hair that reaches his shoulders
| caption      = Albert Dieudonné as Napoleon
| birth_name   = 
| birth_date   = 
| birth_place  = Paris, France
| death_date   = 
| death_place  = Paris, France
| nationality  = 
| other_names  = 
| years active = 1917–1943
| known_for    = Napoleon Bonaparte in Napoleon
| occupation   = 
}}

Albert Dieudonné (26 November 1889 – 19 March 1976) was a French actor, screenwriter, film director and novelist.

Biography
Dieudonné was born in Paris, France, and made his acting debut in silent film in 1908 for The Assassination of the Duke of Guise, with musical score by Camille Saint-Saëns. In 1924, he directed the film drama Catherine, in which he also appeared as a major character. Jean Renoir acted as his assistant director on the film.

Between 1915 and 1916, Dieudonné acted in five films for director Abel Gance, including the 1915 film La Folie du Docteur Tube and the 1916 film Le périscope. In 1927 he was hired back to star in the title role in Gance's epic film, Napoléon. In 1929 Dieudonné wrote a novel that was made into a 1930 musical comedy film titled The Sweetness of Loving, and he wrote the script for the 1936 La Garçonne.

Albert Dieudonné died in Paris in 1976 at the age of 86. According to his last wishes, he is buried wearing his Napoleon costume.

Selected filmographyLa Folie du Docteur Tube (1915) Le périscope (1916)Anguish (1917)
 The Jackals (1917)
 The Crushed Idol (1920)
 Jacques Landauze (1920)Napoléon'' (1927)

References

External links

1889 births
1976 deaths
20th-century French male actors
20th-century French novelists
French film directors
French male film actors
French male novelists
French male silent film actors
Male actors from Paris
20th-century French male writers